The 2023 Italian F4 Championship Powered by Abarth will be the tenth season of the Italian F4 Championship.

Teams and drivers 

 Aurélia Nobels was originally scheduled to compete for Iron Dames, but switched to Prema Racing prior to the start of the season.

Race calendar and results 
The calendar was revealed on 24 October 2022.

Notes

References

External links 

 
 ACI Sport page

Italian F4 Championship seasons
Italian
F4 Championship
Italian F4